The 2015–16 Liga EBA season is the 22nd edition of the Liga EBA. This is the fourth division of Spanish basketball. Four teams will be promoted to LEB Plata. The regular season will start in October 2015 and will finish in March 2016. The Final Stage to LEB Plata will be in April 2016.

Format

Regular season
Teams are divided in five groups by geographical criteria. Groups A, C and D are divided in two.

Group A–A: Cantabria, Basque Country, La Rioja, Navarre and Castile and León.
Group A–B: Galicia, Asturias and Castile and León.
Group B: Community of Madrid, Castile-La Mancha and Canary Islands.
Groups C–A and C–B: Catalonia and Balearic Islands.
Group D–A: Andalusia and Melilla.
Group D–B: Andalusia and Extremadura.
Group E: Valencian Community and Region of Murcia.

Final stage
The three best teams of each group and the fourth of Group D (champion of the previous season) will play the Final Stage. From these 16 teams, only four will be promoted to LEB Plata. The winner of each group can organize a group stage.

The Final Stage will be played round-robin format in groups of four teams where the first qualified of each group will host one of the stages.

Regular season

Group A–A

Group A–B

Group B

Group C–A

Group C–B

Group C–1

Group C–2

Group D–A

Group D–B

Group D (Second stage)

Group D (7th to 12th position group)

Playoff
The four winners of the quarterfinals will qualify to the Final Stage.

|}

Final Four

Group D (Relegation group)

Group E

Group E–1

Group E–2

Promotion playoffs
The 16 qualified teams will be divided in four groups of four teams. The first qualified teams will host the groups, played with a round-robin format. They will be played from 20 to 22 May 2016.

The winner of each group will promote to LEB Plata.

Group 1 – L'Hospitalet de Llobregat

Group 2 – Plasencia

Group 3 – Gandia

Group 4 – León

References

External links
Liga EBA at FEB.es

Liga EBA seasons
EBA